This is a list of Telugu-language films produced in the year 1977.

1977

References

External links
 Amaradeepam film at IMDb.

1977
Telugu
Telugu films